Finniss may refer to:

People
 B. T. Finniss (1807–1893), Premier of South Australia

Places
 Electoral district of Finniss, an electoral district in South Australia
 Finniss, South Australia, a small town 
 Finniss Conservation Park, a protected area in South Australia
 Hundred of Finniss (Northern Territory), a cadastral unit
 Hundred of Finniss (South Australia), a cadastral unit

See also
 Finnis, a related surname
 Finniss River (disambiguation)